Martin Banks (born 19 September 1989) is a New Zealand rugby union player who plays for  in the Bunnings NPC and the  in Super Rugby. His position is First five-eighth and occasionally Fullback.

Career
Banks was playing for the Takapuna Rugby Club in Auckland when the opportunity came from the Canterbury Rugby Union to head to Russia to play for Krasny Yar Krasnoyarsk. After a season with the side, he was offered a two-year contract with Krasny Yar but Banks chose to leave the country and come back to New Zealand, where he began his career with Buller. He made his provincial debut with the side in the 2012 Heartland Championship, Banks scored a record 131 points for the province, including 16 in Buller's 31–28 win over South Canterbury in the Lochore Cup final.

Banks was later called into the squad and made his debut against . In October Banks landed a Super Rugby deal with the Hurricanes. Banks had been prominent at first five-eighth, and Hurricanes coach Mark Hammett said his incredible kicking game had been hard to ignore. But at the end of 2014, he signed a deal with the Highlanders for the 2015 and 2016 seasons. In May 2016, Banks signed a 1-year deal with Italian rugby union team Benetton.

He returned to the Highlanders for the 2019 Super Rugby season.

References

External links

1989 births
New Zealand rugby union players
Buller rugby union players
Tasman rugby union players
Hurricanes (rugby union) players
Highlanders (rugby union) players
Benetton Rugby players
NTT DoCoMo Red Hurricanes Osaka players
Southland rugby union players
Rugby union fly-halves
Rugby union fullbacks
Living people
People educated at Christchurch Boys' High School
People from Reefton
Rugby union players from West Coast, New Zealand